{{Taxobox
| name = Urothoe elegans
| image = Urothoe elegans.jpg
| image_caption = Urothoe elegans
| regnum = Animalia
| phylum = Arthropoda
| subphylum = Crustacea
| classis = Malacostraca
| ordo = Amphipod
| subordo = Gammaridea
| familia = Urothoidae
| genus = Urothoe
| genus_authority = 
| species = U. elegans
| binomial = Urothoe elegans
| binomial_authority = (Bate, 1857)
| synonyms = 
 Gammarus elegans (Mihi)
 Urothoe abbreviata G. O. Sars, 1879
 Urothoe norvegica Boeck, 1861
}}Urothoe elegans'' is a species of very small marine amphipod crustaceans in the family Urothoidae. It was first described from Plymouth.

References 

 Effects de la temperature sur les rythmes d'emergence des peracarides fouisseurs, Urothoe elegans (amphipode) et Eurydice inermis (isopode). C Macquart‐Moulin - Marine & Freshwater Behaviour & Phy, 1980

External links 

 Urothoe elegans at WoRMS

Gammaridea
Crustaceans described in 1857